is a passenger railway station located in Tama-ku, Kawasaki, Kanagawa Prefecture, Japan, operated by the East Japan Railway Company (JR East).

Lines
Inadazutsumi Station is served by the Nambu Line.

Station layout
The station consists of two opposed side platforms serving two tracks, connected by a footbridge. The station is staffed.

Platforms

History
Inadazutsumi Station opened on 1 November 1927 as a station on the Nambu Railway. The Nambu Railway was nationalized on 1 April 1944, and the station came under the control of Japanese National Railways (JNR). With the privatization of JNR on 1 April 1987, the station was absorbed into the JR East network.

Passenger statistics
In fiscal 2019, the station was used by an average of 26,453 passengers daily (boarding passengers only).

The passenger figures (boarding passengers only) for previous years are as shown below.

Surrounding area
 Keio-inadazutsumi Station (Keio Sagamihara Line)
 Inada Park

See also
 List of railway stations in Japan

References

External links

  

Railway stations in Kanagawa Prefecture
Railway stations in Kawasaki, Kanagawa
Railway stations in Japan opened in 1927